The Kit-Cat Club (sometimes Kit Kat Club) was an early 18th-century English club in London with strong political and literary associations. Members of the club were committed Whigs. They met at the Trumpet tavern in London and at Water Oakley in the Berkshire countryside.

The first meetings were held at a tavern in Shire Lane (parallel with Bell Yard and now covered by the Royal Courts of Justice) run by an innkeeper called Christopher Catt. He gave his name to the mutton pies known as "Kit Cats" from which the name of the club is derived.

The club later moved to the Fountain Tavern on The Strand (now the site of Simpson's-in-the-Strand), and latterly into a room specially built for the purpose at Barn Elms, the home of the secretary Jacob Tonson. In summer, the club met at the Upper Flask, Hampstead Heath.

Origins

The origin of the name "Kit-Cat Club" is unclear. In 1705 Thomas Hearne wrote: "The Kit Cat Club got its name from Christopher Catling. [Note, a Pudding Pye man.]" Other sources give his surname as Catt (or some variant such as Cat or Katt): John Timbs ("Club Life of London"), Ophelia Field ("The Kit-Kat Club"), John Macky ("A Journey Through England").

A nickname for Christopher is "Kit". Christopher Catt was the keeper of a pie-house in Shire Lane, by Temple Bar, where the club originally met. His famous mutton pies ("Kit-Kats") were named after him, and formed a standing dish at meetings of the club; the pie is thus itself sometimes regarded (e.g., by Addison in the Spectator) as the origin of the club's name.

It is possible that the club began at the end of the 17th century as the so-called "Order of the Toast". Indeed, a famous characteristic of the Kit-Kat was its toasting glasses, used for drinking the health of the reigning beauties of the day; verses in their praise were engraved on the glasses. If so, one can place the date before 1699, when Elkanah Settle wrote a poem "To the most renowned the President and the rest of the Knights of the most Noble Order of the Toast." It was this very habit of "toasting" that led Dr. Arbuthnot to produce the following epigram, which hints at yet another possible origin of the Club's name:

Possible earlier objectives 
John Vanbrugh's modern biographer Kerry Downes suggests that the club's origins go back to before the Glorious Revolution of 1688; and that its political importance for the promotion of Whig objectives was greater before it became known. Those objectives were a strong Parliament, a limited monarchy, resistance to France, and the Protestant succession to the throne. Downes cites John Oldmixon, who knew many of those involved, and who wrote in 1735 of how some club members "before the Revolution [of 1688] met frequently in the Evening at a Tavern, near Temple Bar, to unbend themselves after Business, and have a little free and cheerful Conversation in those dangerous Times". Horace Walpole, son of Kit-Cat Robert Walpole, refers to the respectable middle-aged 18th-century Kit-Cat club as "generally mentioned as a set of wits, in reality the patriots that saved Britain".

Prominent members 
Amongst the club's membership were writers such as William Congreve, John Locke, Sir John Vanbrugh,  and Joseph Addison, and politicians including  Duke of Somerset, the Earl of Burlington, Duke of Newcastle-upon-Tyne, The Earl of Stanhope, Viscount Cobham, Abraham Stanyan and Sir Robert Walpole.

Other notables included Samuel Garth, Charles Dartiquenave, Count Saint Germain, Richard Steele, and the Dukes of Grafton, Devonshire, Kingston, Richmond, Manchester, Dorset, and Lords Sunderland and Wharton. Of some notoriety were Lord Mohun and the Earl of Berkeley. The artist Sir Godfrey Kneller was also a member, his 48 portraits in a standard "kit-cat" format of 36 by 28 inches, painted over more than twenty years, form the most complete known members list of the club. Many of these portraits currently hang in galleries created in a partnership between the National Portrait Gallery and the National Trust at Beningbrough Hall in North Yorkshire.

Toasts 
The toasts of the Kit-Kat Club were famous at the time, and were drunk to the honour of a reigning beauty, or lady to whom the Club wished to do particular honour. We know by name some of those who were toasted: Lady Mary Wortley Montagu; Lady Godolphin, Lady Sunderland, Lady Bridgewater, and Lady Monthermer, all daughters of John Churchill, 1st Duke of Marlborough, except Lady Mary Wortley Montagu who was the daughter of Evelyn Pierrepont, 5th Earl of Kingston-upon-Hull and only 7 years old when toasted; the Duchess of Bolton, the Duchess of Beaufort, the Duchess of St Albans; Anne Long, a daughter of Sir James Long, 2nd Baronet and friend of Jonathan Swift; Catherine Barton, Newton's niece and Charles Montagu's mistress; Mrs. Brudenell and Lady Wharton, Lady Carlisle and Mrs. Kirk and Mademoiselle Spanheim, among them. Those toasted had their names engraved on a glass goblet.

See also
The Scriblerian and the Kit-Cats

References and sources
References

Sources

Downes, Kerry (1987). Sir John Vanbrugh: A Biography. London: Sidgwick and Jackson.
Hearne, Thomas (1705) Ductor historicus; or a short system of universal history 1698—ed. 2, augmented and improv'd 1704–05 (1714)
 Field, Ophelia (2008). The Kit-Kat Club, London: Harper.
 Swift, Jonathan D.D. (1727) The Works of Jonathan Swift, D.D., Containing Additional Letters &c. Volume XIII  reprinted, Edinburgh: Walter Scott (1814)

External links

 

Stuart England
Politics of the Kingdom of Great Britain
John Vanbrugh
Dining clubs
Gentlemen's clubs in London
18th century in London
Political organisations based in the United Kingdom